Formizm (English: Formism) was a Polish avant-garde literary and art movement active in the years 1917 to 1922. It drew inspirations from Cubism, Expressionism and Futurism as well as Polish folk art. Together with Unism, started by Władysław Strzemiński in the early 1920s, Formizm was one of the two independently Polish avant-garde movements.

History 
The movement began in 1917 in Kraków where several artists united under the banner of Polish Expressionists. Their first exhibition was organized at the Society of Friends of Fine Arts in Kraków on 4 November 1917. In 1919, one year after Poland had regained its independence, the group adopted the name "Formiści" ("Formists"), reflecting their interest in examining the question of form in visual art and an intention to move beyond Expressionism. Formists opposed naturalism in painting and wished to incorporate influences from other Western avant-garde movements, particularly Cubism in France and Futurism in Italy, to create an independently Polish movement. To that end, Formists incorporated various elements of Polish folk, including motifs from glass painting from the Podhale region. Apart from Kraków, the movement was also active in Warsaw, Lviv and Poznań.

Between 1919 and 1921, the group published a periodical titled Formiści (The Formists) which "became a platform for the exchange of progressive ideas developed in parallel across Europe"' and facilitated connections between Western and Central and Eastern European modern artists.

Its members included Leon Chwistek, Tytus Czyżewski, Zbigniew Pronaszko, Andrzej Pronaszko, Konrad Winkler, August Zamoyski, Jan Hrynkowski, Tymon Niesiołowski, Jacek Mierzejewski, Zygmunt Radnicki and Stanisław Ignacy Witkiewicz, among other writers and visual artists.

References 

Polish art
Modern art
Kraków